This is a list of butterflies of Colombia. About 1,600 species are known from Colombia.

Hesperiidae

Hesperiinae
Aethilla memmius
Anthoptus epictetus
Apaustus gracilis
Apaustus menes
Atalopedes campestris
Callimormus alsimo
Charidia lucaria
Cymaenes odilia trebius
Dubiella fiscella
Ephyriades arcas
Halotus angellus
Hesperia notata
Hesperia syrichtus
Hylephila isonira
Hylephila phyleus
Lento lento
Lerema accius
Mnasitheus simplicissima
Mnestheus ittona
Niconiades merenda
Orneates aegiochus
Padraona imerius
Panoquina sylvicola
Papias integra
Papias subcostulata
Perichares philetes
Perichares phocion
Polites atenion
Saliana esperi
Saliana longirostris
Saliana placens
Serdis kirschi
Sophista aristoteles
Telegonus hahneli
Thespieus pinda
Thracides telegonus
Thymelicus athenion
Tigasis aphilos
Typhedanus orion
Vettius artona
Vettius coryna
Vettius lafrenaye
Vettius marcus
Vorates decorus
Zenis janka

Heteropterinae
Dalla frater
Dalla superior

Pyrginae
Achlyodes busirus
Achlyodes pallida
Anastrus obscurus
Anastrus sempiternus
Astraptes alardus aquila
Astraptes fulgerator
Astraptes talus
Augiades crinisus
Autochton aunus
Autochton bipunctatus
Autochton crinisus
Autochton shema
Autochton zarex
Chioides catillus
Chrysoplectrum perniciosus
Cycloglypha thrasibulus
Cyclosemia anastomosis
Dyscophellus euribates
Dyscophellus pharaxanor
Entheus dius
Entheus mathodius
Entheus priassus
Epargyreus spinta
Eracon bufonia
Gorgopas sneiderni
Haemactis sanguinalis
Helias phalaenoides
Heliopetes alana
Heliopetes arsalte
Heliopetes leca
Hyalothyrus infernalis
Hyalothyrus neleus
Mylon pulcherius
Nisoniades ephora
Noctuana haematospila
Noctuana noctus
Phanus vitreus
Phareas coeleste
Phocides pigmalion
Phocides thernus
Potamanaxas flavofasciata
Proteides mercurius
Pyrgus notata
Pyrgus oileus
Pyrgus syrichtus
Pythonides amaryllis
Pythonides supar
Sostrata adamantinus
Sostrata grippa
Telemiades species
Urbanus dorantes
Urbanus eurycles
Urbanus proteus
Urbanus simplicius
Urbanus teleus
Xenophanes tryxus

Pyrrhopyginae
Amenis pionia
Elbella scylla
Jemadia fallax
Jemadia gnetus
Jemadia hospita
Mimoniades minthe
Mimoniades nurscia malis
Mimoniades pityusa
Myscelus amystis
Pyrrhopyge decipiens
Pyrrhopyge phidias
Pyrrhopyge schausi
Pyrrhopyge selina
Pyrrhogyra crameri nautica

Lycaenidae

Polyommatinae
Hemiargus hanno
Leptotes andicola
Leptotes casius

Theclinae
Airamanna rhaptissima
Antephrys marialis
Antephrys santander
Arawacus aetolius
Arawacus leucogyna
Arawacus togarna
Arcas imperialis
Arcas lecromi
Arcas tuneta
Argentostriatus calus
Atlides atis
Atlides didymaon
Atlides polybe
Caerofethra calchinia
Calycopis beon
Calystryma trebula
Camissecla cleocha
Celmia celmus
Chalybs janias
Chlorostrymon telea
Cryptaenota mavors
Cryptaenota rarous
Cyanophrys distractus
Cyanophrys pseudolongula
Cyanophrys remuborealis
Cycnus battus
Cycnus phaleros
Denivia hemon
Denivia triquetra
Egides aegides
Evenus candidus
Evenus nobilis
Everes tulliola
Janthecla leea
Janthecla malvina
Johnsonita johnsoni
Lamprospilus decorata
Lamprospilus nicetus
Laothus phydela
Leptopes striata
Macusia satyroides
Marachina maraches
Megathecla cupentus
Micandra circinata
Micandra comae
Micandra platyptera
Ministrymon azia
Mithras orobia
Nesiostrymon endela
Ocaria aholiba
Olynthus ophelia
Ostrinotes gentiana
Panthiades aeolus pelion
Panthiades bathildis
Paralustrus commodus
Paralustrus salazari
Parrhasius selika
Penaincisalia loxurina
Plesiocyanophrys angela
Plesiocyanophrys lamellalatus
Plesiocyanophrys salazari
Plesiocyanophrys silverado
Pontirama andradei
Pseudolycaena marsyas
Radissima torresi
Rekoa meton
Rekoa palegon
Rhamma arria
Rhamma emeraldina
Rhamma familiaris
Strephonota strephon
Strymon anthracaetus
Strymon caldasensis
Strymon gabatha
Thecla alihoba
Thecla ana
Thecla cadmus
Thecla episcopali
Thecla giberosa
Theclopsis eryx
Thecloxurina atymnides
Thecloxurina quindiensis
Tigrinota ellida ellida
Tigrinota jennifera
Tmolus echion

Nymphalidae

Acraeinae
Actinote alcione
Actinote anteas
Actinote callianira
Actinote callianthe
Actinote desmiala
Actinote dicaeus
Actinote equatoria
Actinote eresia
Actinote flavibasis
Actinote guatemalena
Actinote hylonome
Actinote iguaquensis
Actinote melampeplos
Actinote neleus
Actinote ozomene
Actinote parapheles
Actinote pellenea adriana
Actinote stratonice stratonice
Actinote tenebrarum
Actinote thalia

Apaturinae
Doxocopa cherubina
Doxocopa clothilda
Doxocopa cyane
Doxocopa elis
Doxocopa felderi
Doxocopa laurentia
Doxocopa pavon

Biblidinae
Adelpha alala completa
Adelpha alala negra
Adelpha attica carmela
Adelpha bocotia bocotia
Adelpha boreas
Adelpha cocala
Adelpha corcyra
Adelpha cytherea
Adelpha erotia
Adelpha eytherea daguana
Adelpha iphicla
Adelpha iphiclus
Adelpha irma
Adelpha ixia
Adelpha justina
Adelpha lara fassli
Adelpha lara hypsenor
Adelpha lara mainas
Adelpha lara trasiens
Adelpha lerna
Adelpha mesentina
Adelpha olynthya levicula
Adelpha olynthya olynthya
Adelpha ophiclus iphicolea
Adelpha paraena
Adelpha philaca frausina
Adelpha phylaca delphicola
Adelpha plesaure phliassa
Adelpha rothschildi
Adelpha salmoneus
Adelpha saundersii
Adelpha serpa godmanii
Adelpha sichaeus
Adelpha ximena
Adelpha zalmona eponia
Adelpha zina
Asterope buckleyi
Asterope degandii
Asterope optima
Biblis hyperia
Callicore aegina bella
Callicore aegina stichelli
Callicore cynosura
Callicore dedina
Callicore eunomia
Callicore hystaspes
Callicore ines
Callicore pitheas
Callicore platytaenia
Callicore pygas
Callicore tolima
Catonephele acontius acontius
Catonephele antinoe
Catonephele chromis chromis
Catonephele mexicana
Catonephele numilia esite
Catonephele numilia numilia
Catonephele oriste
Catonephele salacia
Catonephele salambria
Diaethria anna
Diaethria artenis
Diaethria clymena
Diaethria dodone
Diaethria eluina
Diaethria euclides
Diaethria marchalii
Diaethria neglecta
Diaethria pholgea
Diaethria seraphina
Dynamine anubis
Dynamine artemisia
Dynamine chryseis
Dynamine erchia
Dynamine gisella
Dynamine glauce
Dynamine myrson
Dynamine onias
Dynamine persis
Dynamine racidula
Dynamine sara
Dynamine theseus
Ectima lirides
Ectima rectifascia
Ectima thecla astricta
Epiphile boliviana
Epiphile chrysites
Epiphile dinoma
Epiphile dinora
Epiphile epimenes
Epiphile episcate
Epiphile eriopis
Epiphile orea iblis
Eunica alcmena flora
Eunica alpais alpais
Eunica anna
Eunica bechina bechina
Eunica caelina alycia
Eunica carias cabira
Eunica clytia
Eunica concordia
Eunica eurota
Eunica malvina malvina
Eunica marsolia fasula
Eunica mygdonia mygdonia
Eunica norica norica
Eunica pomona
Eunica veronica
Eunica viola
Eunica volumna celma
Hamadryas alicia
Hamadryas amphinome
Hamadryas arinome
Hamadryas chloe
Hamadryas clytemnestra
Hamadryas dione
Hamadryas februa
Hamadryas feronia
Hamadryas laodamia
Marpesia alcibiades
Marpesia berania
Marpesia catulus
Marpesia chirop
Marpesia coresia
Marpesia corina
Marpesia crethon
Marpesia egina
Marpesia hermione
Marpesia iole
Marpesia livius
Marpesia marcella
Marpesia merops
Marpesia norica
Marpesia orsilochus
Marpesia petreus
Mestra semifulua
Myscelia capenas octomaculata
Nessaea aglaura
Nessaea hewitsoni
Nessaea regina
Nica flavilla
Panacea divalis
Panacea procilla
Panacea prola
Panacea regina
Paulogramma peristera
Peria lamis
Perisama aequatorialis
Perisama alicia ilia
Perisama auriclea
Perisama bomplandii
Perisama cardense
Perisama cloelia
Perisama diotina
Perisama dorbignyi
Perisama harzama
Perisama humboltii
Perisama lebasii
Perisama mariana
Perisama oppelii
Perisama patara
Perisama tryphena
Perisama voninka
Pyrrhogyra edocla
Pyrrhogyra nasica
Pyrrhogyra neaerea
Pyrrhogyra otolais
Smyrna blomfildia
Temenis laothoe laothoe
Temenis laothoe ottonis
Temenis laothoe violetta
Temenis pulchra

Brassolinae
Brassolis granadensis
Brassolis isthmia
Brassolis sophorae
Caligo atreus agesilaus
Caligo atreus atreus
Caligo brasiliensis
Caligo eurilochus
Caligo idomeneus
Caligo illioneus illioneus
Caligo illioneus oberon
Caligo memnon
Caligo oberthurii
Caligo oedipus
Caligo oileus scamander
Caligo philimos
Caligo placidianus
Caligo prometheus
Caligo zeuxippus obsecurus
Catoblepia berecynthia
Catoblepia generosa
Catolepsis soranus
Dynastor macrosiris strix
Eryphanis lycomedon automedon
Eryphanis polyxena
Opsiphanes bogotanus bogotanus
Opsiphanes cassiae
Opsiphanes cassina chiriquensis
Opsiphanes invirae
Opsiphanes invirae cuspidatus
Opsiphanes invirae stieheli
Opsiphanes quiteria augerias
Opsiphanes quiteria quirinus
Opsiphanes tamarindi corrosus
Selenophanes josephus

Charaxinae
Agrias aedon
Agrias amydon amaryllis
Agrias beatifica pherenice
Agrias beatifica staudingeri
Agrias claudina
Agrias eurimedia eurimedia
Agrias sardanapalus intermedia
Anaea aidae
Archaeoprepona demophon demophon
Archaeoprepona demophoon gulina
Archaeoprepona licomedes
Archaeoprepona phaedra
Consul fabius cecrops
Consul fabius fabius
Consul fabius ochraceus
Consul fabius semifulvus
Consul fabius titheroides
Consul panariste
Fountainea eurypyle
Fountainea glycerium comstoki
Fountainea glycerium glycerium
Fountainea nesea
Fountainea nessus
Fountainea ryphea ryphea
Fountainea titan
Hypna clytemnestra clytemnestra
Memphis anna
Memphis arachne
Memphis austrina
Memphis glauce
Memphis glaucone
Memphis laura rosae
Memphis lineata
Memphis lyceus
Memphis lynneeus
Memphis oenomais
Memphis pasibula
Memphis polycarmes
Memphis proserpina
Memphis pseudiphis
Memphis xenocles
Noreppa chromus
Polygrapha xenocrates xenocrates
Prepona laertes
Prepona praeneste
Siderone mars
Siderone marthesia
Zaretis itys
Zaretis syene

Danainae
Danaus berenice hermippus
Danaus eresimus
Danaus gilippus
Danaus plexippus megalippe
Ituna ilione
Lycorea cledobaea atergatis
Lycorea halia
Lycorea pasinuntia

Heliconiinae
Agraulis vanillae lucina
Dione glycera
Dione juno
Dione moneta butleri
Dione moneta moneta
Dryadula phaetusa
Dryas iulia
Eueides aliphera
Eueides edias
Eueides eolias
Eueides isabella arquata
Eueides lybia olympia
Eueides procula edias
Eueides seitzi
Eueides tales calathus
Eueides vibilia unifasciatus
Heliconius antiochus
Heliconius aoede bartletti
Heliconius charitonius
Heliconius clysonimus
Heliconius clytia
Heliconius congerge aquilionaris
Heliconius cydno zelinde
Heliconius doris
Heliconius earondona
Heliconius eleisatus
Heliconius erato dignus
Heliconius erato lativitta
Heliconius erato venus
Heliconius eucomus metallis
Heliconius euphone
Heliconius hecale marius
Heliconius hecale melicerta
Heliconius hecale quitalena
Heliconius hecuba flava
Heliconius hierax
Heliconius ismenius abadae
Heliconius lenaeus
Heliconius leucadia
Heliconius melponeme aglaope
Heliconius melponeme bellula
Heliconius melponeme vulcanus
Heliconius numata aristona
Heliconius numata euphone
Heliconius numata euphrasius
Heliconius numata idalion
Heliconius numata mesene
Heliconius numata numata
Heliconius sapho chocoensis
Heliconius sara apseudes
Heliconius sara sara
Heliconius sara sprucei
Heliconius sara thamar
Heliconius vicinia
Heliconius wallacei
Heliconius xanthocles explicata
Heliconius xanthocles melete
Philaethria dido
Philaethria pygmalion
Podotricha eucroia
Podotricha telesiphe tithraustes

Ithomiinae
Aeria eurimedia agna
Aeria eurimedia eurimedia
Cerasticada doto
Ceratinia cayana
Ceratinia fraterna
Ceratinia iolaia iolaia
Ceratinia nise nise
Ceratinia tulia dorilla
Ceratinia tutia poecila
Ceratinia tutia poecilla
Dircenna adina marica
Dircenna dero
Dircenna euchytma
Dircenna jemina
Dircenna klugii
Dircenna loreta
Dircenna methonella
Dircenna olyras relata
Dircenna xanthophane
Elzunia humboldt humboldt
Elzunia pavonii
Episcada mira
Episcada sidonia
Eutresis hypereia imitatrix
Forbestra equicola equicoloides
Godyris dircenna
Godyris duillia albinotata
Godyris hewitsoni
Godyris neops neops
Godyris panthyale phantyale
Godyris panthyale quinta
Godyris panthylea
Godyris zavaleta amaretta
Godyris zavaleta caesioptica
Godyris zavaleta gonussa
Greta alphesiboea
Greta andromica dromica
Greta libethris
Heterosais giulia nephele
Hyalyris coeno florida
Hyalyris coeno norella
Hyalyris excelsa excelsa
Hyalyris oulitia oulitia
Hymenitis nero
Hypoleria adelphina
Hypoleria aurcliana
Hypoleria chrysodonia
Hypoleria famina
Hypoleria karschi
Hypoleria ocaela
Hypoleria orolina
Hypomenitis theudelinda
Hyposcada anchiala anchiala
Hyposcada illinissa dinilia
Hypothyris anastasia honesta
Hypothyris euclea intermedia
Hypothyris euclea valora
Hypothyris lycaste dionaea
Hypothyris lycaste fraterna
Hypothyris ninonia antonia
Hypothyris ninonia dhipes
Hypothyris ninonica opollini
Hypothyris semifulva putumayensis
Ithomia agnosia amarila
Ithomia avella avella
Ithomia derasa
Ithomia diasia diasia
Ithomia dryma
Ithomia hyala hyala
Ithomia iphianassa alienassa
Ithomia terra terra
Ithomia travella
Mechanitis doryssus veritabilis
Mechanitis egaensis
Mechanitis istmia doryssides
Mechanitis lysimnia elisa
Mechanitis mazaeus eggensis
Mechanitis mazaeus macrinus
Mechanitis mazeaeus mazeaeus
Mechanitis mazeaeus messenoides
Mechanitis menapis menapis
Mechanitis mesenoides deceptus
Mechanitis panmitera
Mechanitis polymmia caucaensis
Mechanitis polymnia werneri
Melinaea ethra maeonis
Melinaea lilis doona
Melinaea ludovica
Melinaea maelus cydon
Melinaea marsaeus macaria
Melinaea marsaeus messenina
Melinaea marsaeus mothoe
Melinaea menophilus ernestor
Melinaea menophilus simulatur
Melinaea mnasias lucifer
Melinaea mneme
Methona confusa
Methona esafusa
Napeogenes achaea nicolayi
Napeogenes apulia
Napeogenes inachia pharo
Napeogenes perantes azeka
Napeogenes stella
Napeogenes sylphis corena
Napeogenes verticilla
Oleria agarista
Oleria amalda
Oleria astraea
Oleria athalina banjana
Oleria athalina tremona
Oleria caucana
Oleria estella
Oleria kena
Oleria lerdina
Oleria lota
Oleria luliberda
Oleria makrena makrena
Oleria makrena makrenita
Oleria phenomoe
Oleria quadrata
Oleria sexmaculata
Oleria tigilla
Oleria zelica
Ollantaya oneida
Ollantaya thabena
Ollantaya zabina
Olyras praestan
Pagyris cymothoe sylvella
Patricia dercyllidas
Pteronymia aletta agalla
Pteronymia antisae
Pteronymia artena
Pteronymia latilla
Pteronymia laura
Pteronymia notilla
Pteronymia obscurata
Pteronymia sparsa
Pteronymia vestilla vestilla
Pteronymia zerlina
Sais paraensis
Sais rosalia mosella
Sais rosalia promissa
Sais rosalia rosalinda
Scada batesi
Scada ethica
Scada quotidiana
Scada theaphia batesi
Scada zibia xanthina
Thyridia psidii
Tithorea harmonia
Tithorea pinthias
Tithorea tarricina hecalesia

Libytheinae
Cartea vitula
Diophthalma lagora lepida
Diophthalma philemon philemon
Echenais adelina
Echenais thelephus
Emesis lucinda
Helicopis cupido
Imelda glaucosmia
Ithomiola cascella
Ithomiola floralis
Lucilla camissa
Lybytheana carinenta
Lymnas cratia
Lymnas iarbas
Nahida coenoides
Napaea eucharilla merula
Napaea nepos tanos
Napaea theages
Napaea veruta
Semomesia unduosa
Teratophthalma nigrita
Teratophthalma phelina
Voltinia theata
Xinias cynosema hyalodis

Limenitidinae
Baeotus amazonicus
Baeotus baeotus
Baeotus deucalion
Colobura dirce
Historis acheronta
Historis odius orion
Pycina zamba
Tigridia acesta

Melitaeinae
Gnathotriche exclamationis
Phyciodes perilla
Phyciodes ptolyca
Phyciodes virilis

Morphinae
Antirrhea avernus
Antirrhea eaquenius
Antirrhea isabelae
Antirrhea miltiades
Antirrhea taygetina
Antirrhea watkinsi
Morpho achilles
Morpho adonis
Morpho amathonte
Morpho cisseis
Morpho cypris lelargei
Morpho eugenia
Morpho granadiensis
Morpho hecuba hecuba
Morpho hecuba polyxena
Morpho hecuba werneri
Morpho helenor helenor
Morpho hermione
Morpho leontius leontius
Morpho menelaus melacheidus
Morpho menelaus menelaus
Morpho menenaus nigra
Morpho micropthalmus
Morpho neoptolemus
Morpho patroclus
Morpho peleides peleides
Morpho retenor
Morpho rodopteron
Morpho rugita eniata
Morpho staudinger
Morpho sulkowski
Morpho telemachus
Morpho theseus cretacea
Morpho theseus theseus

Nymphalinae
Anartia amathea
Anartia jatrophae
Anthanassa drusilla
Batesia hypochlora
Castilia angusta
Castilia castilla
Castilia ofella
Castilia perilla
Chlosyne lacinia
Chlosyne narva
Chlosyne nivea
Cybdeles mnasylus
Eresia alsina
Eresia anomla
Eresia clara
Eresia etesiae
Eresia eunice
Eresia eutropia
Eresia ithomioides
Eresia letitia
Eresia levina
Eresia margaretha
Eresia mechanithis
Eresia moesta fassli
Eresia moesta moesta
Eresia oblita
Eresia pelonia
Eresia phaedima
Eresia polina
Eresia selene
Euptoieta hegesia
Hypanartia godmanii
Hypanartia kefersteini
Hypanartia lethe
Hypanartia linfigii
Janatella leucodesma
Junonia evarete
Junonia genoveva
Junonia lavinia
Junonia vestina
Ortilia gentione
Siproeta elissa
Siproeta epaphus
Siproeta stelenes
Siproeta sulpitia
Tegosa anieta luka
Tegosa similis
Telenassa trimaculata
Thessalia theona
Vanessa braziliensis
Vanessa cardui
Vanessa carye
Vanessa virginiensis

Satyrinae
Bia actorion actorion
Caeruleuptychia aegrota
Catargynnis pholoe
Cepheuptychia cephus
Chloreuptychia agatha
Chloreuptychia arnaea
Chloreuptychia chloris
Chloreuptychia languida
Cissia albofasciata
Cissia alsione
Cissia benedicta
Cissia cucullina
Cissia enyo
Cissia moepius
Cissia myncea
Cissia penelope
Cissia renata
Cissia ucumariensis
Cissia vesta
Cithaerias aurora
Cithaerias aurorina
Cithaerias erba browni
Cithaerias menander
Cithaerias mimica
Cithaerias pyritosa
Corades chelonis
Corades cistene generosa
Corades enyo almo
Corades medeba
Corades medeba columbina
Corades orcus
Corades pannonia ploas
Daedalma dinias dinias
Dioriste leucospilos
Dulcedo polita
Eretris apuleja
Eretris calisto oculata
Eretris sucannae
Euptychia aegrota
Euptychia agatha
Euptychia antonoe
Euptychia calixta
Euptychia cephus
Euptychia clhoris
Euptychia erichto
Euptychia eusebia
Euptychia gulnare
Euptychia halle
Euptychia herse
Euptychia hesione
Euptychia hesionides
Euptychia inornata
Euptychia marica
Euptychia metaleuca
Euptychia nortia
Euptychia nossis
Euptychia pagyris
Euptychia suboscura
Euptychia terrestris
Euptychia tolumnia
Euptychia vesta
Euptychia westwoodii
Haetera hypaesia
Haetera piera ecuadora
Haetera piera piera
Harjesia obscura
Hermeuptychia erigone
Hermeuptychia hermes
Junea dorinda
Lasiophila behemonth
Lasiophila circe
Lasiophila orbifera
Lasiophila prostymna
Lasiophila zapatosa
Lymanopoda albocincta
Lymanopoda attis
Lymanopoda labineta
Lymanopoda lactea
Lymanopoda lebbaea
Lymanopoda nevada
Lymanopoda obsoleta
Lymanopoda panacea panacea
Lymanopoda panacea venusia
Lymanopoda samius
Magneuptychia lybie
Magneuptychia mimas
Magneuptychia mycalesis
Magneuptychia ocnus
Manataria hercyna hyrnethia
Manataria maculata
Mygona chocoana
Mygona irmina
Mygona orcedice
Mygona propylea
Oressinoma thepla
Oressinoma typhla
Oxeochistus pronax
Oxeochistus simplex
Oxeoschistus protogenia
Panyapedaliodes silpa
Parataygetis beata
Pareuptychia occirrhoe
Pedaliodes cesarense
Pedaliodes cocytia
Pedaliodes drymaea
Pedaliodes empusa
Pedaliodes flavopunctata
Pedaliodes hewitsoni
Pedaliodes jephtha
Pedaliodes juba juba
Pedaliodes juba triquetra
Pedaliodes muscosa
Pedaliodes naevia
Pedaliodes nebris
Pedaliodes niphoessia
Pedaliodes parranda
Pedaliodes patizathes
Pedaliodes peceustes
Pedaliodes pelinaea
Pedaliodes peucestas
Pedaliodes phaedra
Pedaliodes pheres
Pedaliodes phoenissa
Pedaliodes phraciclea
Pedaliodes phrasicla
Pedaliodes plotina
Pedaliodes poesia
Pedaliodes polla
Pedaliodes pollonia
Pedaliodes polusca
Pedaliodes proerna
Pedaliodes socorrae
Pedaloides trimaea
Penrosada leaena
Pierella amalia
Pierella astyoche astyoche
Pierella astyoche lucia
Pierella helvina helvina
Pierella helvina ocreata
Pierella hortona
Pierella hyalinus dracontis
Pierella hyceta
Pierella lamia chalybaea
Pierella lamia columbiana
Pierella lena brasiliensis
Pierella lena glaucolena
Pierella lena obscura
Pierella lesbia
Pierella luna luna
Pierella ocreata
Posttaygetis penelea
Praepronophila perperna
Pronophila brennus
Pronophila juliani
Pronophila orchewitsoni
Pronophila orcus
Pseudohaetera piera
Pseudohaeterea hypaesia
Pseudohaeterea macleannania
Pseudomaniola loxo
Pseudomaniola pholoe
Steremnia pronophila
Steremnia selva
Steroma andensis
Steroma bega
Steroma superba
Taygetis andromeda crameri
Taygetis celia kenaza
Taygetis chrisogone
Taygetis laches
Taygetis larua
Taygetis marpessa
Taygetis mermeria
Taygetis salvini
Taygetis sylvia
Taygetis virgilia
Taygetis xenana xenama
Vila emilia

Papilionidae

Papilioninae
Battus belus belus
Battus belus varus
Battus chalceus ingenuus
Battus crassus lepidus
Battus laodamas
Battus lycidas
Battus polydamas polydamas
Eurytides dolicaon deileon
Eurytides orabilis
Eurytides serville columbus
Eurytides serville serville
Heraclides anchisiades anchisiades
Heraclides anchisiades idaeus
Heraclides androgeus epidaurus
Heraclides astyalus
Heraclides chiansiades
Heraclides cresphontes
Heraclides homothoas
Heraclides isidorus flavescens
Heraclides isidorus pacificus
Heraclides paeon thrason
Heraclides rhodostictus
Heraclides thoas cinyras
Heraclides thoas nealces
Heraclides thoas thoas
Heraclides torquatus jeani
Mimoides ariarathes gayi
Mimoides ariarathes
Mimoides euryleon anatmus
Mimoides euryleon euryleon
Mimoides euryleon pithonius
Mimoides ilus ilus
Mimoides pausanias cleombrotas
Mimoides pausanias hermolaus
Mimoides pausanias pausanias
Mimoides phaon
Mimoides xeniades halex
Mimoides xynias trapeza
Papilio polyxenes americacus
Papilio polyxenes americus
Parides aeneas bolivar
Parides anchises drucei
Parides anchises separis
Parides chabrias chabrias
Parides childrenae childrenae
Parides childrenae latisfasciata
Parides childrenae unimacula
Parides cutorina
Parides erithalion cauca
Parides erithalion erithalion
Parides erithalion keithi
Parides erithalion kruegeri
Parides erithalion smalli
Parides erithalion zeuxis
Parides erythrus
Parides eurimedes agathokles
Parides eurimedes antheas
Parides eurimedes arriphus
Parides eurimedes eurimedes
Parides iphidamas gorgonae
Parides lysander brissonius
Parides neophilus neophilus
Parides neophilus olivencius
Parides panares erythrus
Parides panares lycimenes
Parides panares tachira
Parides phosphorus gratianus
Parides pizarro
Parides sesostris sesostris
Parides sesostris tarquinius
Parides vertumnus bogotanus
Protesilaus glaucolaus hetaerius
Protesilaus glaucolaus melaenus
Protesilaus molops hetaerius
Protesilaus protesilaus archesilaus
Protesilaus telesilaus telesilaus
Protographium agesilaus autosilaus
Protographium agesilaus eimeri
Protographium dioxippus diores
Protographium leucaspis
Protographium thyastes marchandii
Protographium thyastes thyastinus
Pterouros cacicus nesrinae
Pterouros cephalus
Pterourus cacicus
Pterourus euterpinus ebruneus
Pterourus menatius eurotas
Pterourus zagreus bachus

Pieridae

Coliadinae
Anteos clorinde
Anteos menippe
Aphrissa boisduvalii
Aphrissa statira etiolata
Aphrissa statira statira
Colias dimera
Colias lesbia andina
Eurema agave
Eurema albula
Eurema daira
Eurema elathea vitelina
Eurema equatora
Eurema gratiosa
Eurema limbia
Eurema lisa
Eurema mexicana
Eurema mycale
Eurema reticulata
Eurema salome
Eurema venusta limbia
Eurema xantochlora
Kricogonia lyside
Leucidia brephos
Nathalis iole
Phoebis agarithe
Phoebis argante
Phoebis eubule
Phoebis philea philea
Phoebis rurina
Phoebis sennae
Pyrisitia nise
Pyrisitia proterpia
Rhabdodryas trite
Zerene phillippa

Dismorphinae
Dismorphia altis
Dismorphia amphione amphione
Dismorphia amphione argione
Dismorphia amphione broomiae
Dismorphia arcadia medorina
Dismorphia avonia
Dismorphia crisia crisia
Dismorphia crisia foedora
Dismorphia hyposticta manuelita
Dismorphia ines
Dismorphia ithomia
Dismorphia lelex
Dismorphia lewyi leonora
Dismorphia lycosura
Dismorphia lysis
Dismorphia medora
Dismorphia mercenaris
Dismorphia methymna
Dismorphia mirandola
Dismorphia thermesia
Dismorphia theucharilla avonia
Dismorphia theucharilla xanthone
Dismorphia zaela
Dismorphia zathoe core
Dismorphia zathoe zathoe
Enantia licina
Lieinix nemesis
Moschoneura pinthaeus
Patia orise
Pseudopieris nehemia aequatorialis

Pierinae
Archonias tereas approximata
Archonias tereas archidona
Ascia buniae
Ascia monuste orseis
Ascia sevata
Ascia sincera
Catasticta actinotis
Catasticta albofasciata
Catasticta anaitis
Catasticta apaturina
Catasticta bithyna
Catasticta crysolopha
Catasticta flisa dilutior
Catasticta frontina
Catasticta hebra
Catasticta incertina
Catasticta licorgus lanceolata
Catasticta loja
Catasticta maneo
Catasticta notha caucana
Catasticta pastaza
Catasticta philodora
Catasticta philonarche
Catasticta philone
Catasticta philothea
Catasticta prioneris
Catasticta puactata
Catasticta reducta
Catasticta seitzi
Catasticta sisamnus sisamnus
Catasticta sisamnus telasco
Catasticta socorrensis
Catasticta teumatis
Catasticta tomyris tomyris
Catasticta uricoecheae
Catasticta watkinsi
Catasticta zana
Hesperocharis hirlanda
Hesperocharis marchalii
Hesperocharis nera nymphaea
Itaballia demophile demophile
Itaballia pandosia sabata
Itaballia pisonca
Itaballia pisonis
Leodonta chiriquensis
Leodonta tellane
Leodonta zenobina
Leptophobia aripa
Leptophobia caesia semicaesia
Leptophobia caesia tenvicornis
Leptophobia eleone
Leptophobia eleusis
Leptophobia euthemia
Leptophobia monuste
Leptophobia olympia
Leptophobia penthica
Leptophobia philona
Leptophobia smithii
Leptophobia tovaria
Melete florinda daguana
Melete lycimnia aelia
Melete lycimnia lycimnia
Melete peruviana
Melete polyhymnia
Pereute callinice numbalensis
Pereute charops charops
Pereute charops columbia
Pereute charops subvarians
Pereute leucodrosime
Perrhybris lorena lorena
Perrhybris lypora
Perrhybris pyrrha
Pieriballia mandela mandela
Pieriballia mandelena locusta
Tatochila sterodice arctodice
Tatochila xanthodice xanthodice

Riodinidae

Euselasiinae
Euselasia angulata
Euselasia argentea
Euselasia ater
Euselasia aurantia
Euselasia cafusa
Euselasia candaria
Euselasia clithra
Euselasia corduena
Euselasia cyanira
Euselasia euboea
Euselasia eugeon
Euselasia euliona
Euselasia eumedia
Euselasia eumenes
Euselasia eupatra
Euselasia euriteas
Euselasia eusepus
Euselasia hahneli
Euselasia leucorrhoea
Euselasia licinia
Euselasia melaphaea
Euselasia mys crinina
Euselasia orfita eutychus
Euselasia phedica
Euselasia teleclus
Hades hecamede hecate
Hades noctula
Methone cecilia chrysomela

Riodininae
Adelotypa allector mollis
Adelotypa aristus
Adelotypa penthea
Alesa amesis
Alesa prema
Amarynthis meneria micalia
Ancyluris eryxo
Ancyluris eudaemon
Ancyluris formosa
Ancyluris meliboeus
Ancyluris mira
Ancyluris miranda
Anteros acheus
Anteros allectus
Anteros bracteata
Anteros chrysoprastus
Anteros formosus
Anteros renaldus
Argyrogrammana barine
Argyrogrammana macularia
Argyrogrammana saphirina
Argyrogrammana stilbe
Baeotis felix felicissima
Baeotis nesaea
Brachyglenis esthema
Calospila argenissa
Calospila emylius
Calospila judias
Calospila labobatas
Calospila porthaon
Calydna volcanicus
Caria lampeto
Caria mantinea
Caria trochilus arete
Cariomothis erythromelas
Chalodeta theodora
Charis cleonus
Charis hermodora
Chorinea octauius
Cremna actoris
Crocozona coecias
Emesis angularis
Emesis brimo
Emesis cypria
Emesis cypria phapias
Emesis eurydice
Emesis fatima
Emesis heterochroa
Emesis lucinda aurimma
Emesis lucinda euridice
Emesis lucinda opaca
Emesis mandana aurelia
Emesis ocypore
Eunogyra satyrus curupira
Eurybia cyclopia
Eurybia dardus unxia
Eurybia donna
Eurybia halimede
Eurybia lamia
Eurybia leucolopha
Eurybia lycisca
Eurybia nicaeus erythinosa
Eurybia persona granulata
Hermathena candidata columba
Hyphilaria anophtalma
Hyphilaria anthias
Hyphilaria nicias
Hyphilaria parthenis virgatula
Ithomeis corena
Ithomeis mimica
Juditha molpe
Lasaia agesilas
Lasaia moeros
Lemonias emylius
Leucochimona aequatorialis
Leucochimona lagora
Leucochimona matatha
Leucochimona matisca
Leucochimona philemon
Melanis bodia
Melanis passiena
Melanis pixie
Menander hebrus
Menander menander
Mesene capissene
Mesene hay
Mesene monostigma
Mesene phareus rubella
Mesene semiradiata
Mesophthalma idotea
Mesosemia ahava
Mesosemia asa
Mesosemia cardeni
Mesosemia ceropia
Mesosemia cippus
Mesosemia coelestis
Mesosemia ephyne
Mesosemia eumene
Mesosemia gertraudis
Mesosemia ibycus
Mesosemia judicialis
Mesosemia junta
Mesosemia loruhama
Mesosemia macaris
Mesosemia machaera
Mesosemia maela
Mesosemia maenades
Mesosemia melpia
Mesosemia menoetes
Mesosemia methuana
Mesosemia metura
Mesosemia mevania pacifica
Mesosemia nina
Mesosemia odice
Mesosemia orbona
Mesosemia rhodia
Mesosemia sibiyina
Mesosemia sifia
Mesosemia sylvia
Mesosemia telegone amiana
Mesosemia tenebrosa
Mesosemia ulrica
Mesosemia zanoa orthia
Mesosemia zonalis
Mesosemia zorea
Metacharis lucius
Metacharis regalis indissimilis
Monethe albertus
Monethe rudolphus
Necyria vetulonia
Necyria zaneta
Notheme eumaus
Nymphidium azanoides amazonensis
Nymphidium baeotia
Nymphidium balbinus
Nymphidium cachrus ascolia
Nymphidium caricae
Nymphidium chimborazium
Nymphidium lamis
Nymphidium lisimon plintobaphis
Nymphidium mantus
Nymphidium menalcus ascolia
Nymphidium menalcus platea
Nymphidium minuta
Nymphidium nematostichtum
Nymphidium ninias
Nymphidium nisimias
Nymphidium valbinus
Nymphidium velabrum
Pandemos pasiphae
Parnes nycteis
Perophthalma lasus
Phaenochitonia iasis
Phaenochitonia ignipicta
Rhetus arcius
Rhetus dysonii
Rhetus laodome
Rhetus periander
Riodina lysippus
Sarota acanthoides spicata
Sarota acantus
Sarota chrysus
Setabis epitus
Setabis flamula
Setabis gelanise
Siseme alectryo alectryo
Siseme alectryo megala
Siseme alectryo spectanda
Siseme alectryo tantilla
Siseme aristoteles minerva
Siseme aristoteles sprucei
Siseme neurodes caudalis
Siseme pallas angustior
Siseme pedias
Stalachtis calliope calliope
Stalachtis euterpe latefasciata
Symmachia accusatrix
Symmachia threissa
Symmachia tricolor
Synargis abaris
Synargis arctos tytia
Synargis cyneas
Synargis menalcus
Synargis ochra
Synargis orestes
Synargis phylleus
Synargis praeclara
Synargis victrix
Themone poecila
Theope acosma
Theope agesila
Theope eudocia
Theope leucanthe
Theope pedias
Theope sericea
Theope virgilius
Thestius pholeus
Thisbe irenea irenea
Thisbe molela
Uraneis hyalina
Uraneis ucubis

See also
List of butterflies of the Amazon River basin and the Andes

References 

Butterflies
Butterflies
Colombia

Colombia